Surirella is a genus of diatoms in the family Surirellaceae.

The genus was circumscribed by Pierre Jean François Turpin in Mem. Mus. Hist. Nat. vol.16 on page 361 in 1828.

The genus name of Surirella is in honour of Jacques Simon Armand Suriray (1769–1846), who was a French doctor, naturalist and botanist (Algology), Zoologist, who worked in Le Havre.

References

External links
 
 
 Surirella at AlgaeBase

Surirellales
Diatom genera